Ulaagchinii Khar Nuur National Park is centered on two large freshwater lakes, Bayan Lake to the west, and Ulaagchin Khar Lake 50 km to the east, in west-central Mongolia.  The particular 'Khar Lake' of this park is in Zavkhan Province, located in a depression west of the Tarvagatai Mountains.  Ulaagchin Khar is surrounded by sand dunes and mountains.

Topography
Both lakes are located in the Great Lakes Depression area of western Mongolia, with the Tarvagatai range of the Khangai Mountains immediately to the east. The larger of the lakes, Ulaagchinii Khar Nuur, is freshwater and bordered by sand dunes and local hills to the south. It is 23 km west to east and 5 km north to south, and has a small lake, Baga Lake, to its northwest.  60 km to the west is Bayan Lake.

Climate and ecoregion
The climate of the area is Cold semi-arid climate (Köppen climate classification (BSk)). This climate is characteristic of steppe climates intermediary between desert humid climates, and typically have precipitation above evapotranspiration.  At least one month averages below .

Flora and fauna
the area is a cold semi-desert.  A number of rare waterbirds have been noted at the site, including the endangered White-headed duck (Oxyura leucocephala), the vulnerable Great bustard (Otis tarda), and the vulnerable White-throated bush chat (Saxicola insignis).

See also
 List of national parks of Mongolia

References

External links
 Park borders, Ulaagchinii Khar Nuur National Park, ProtectedPlanet.net

National parks of Mongolia